The 1983 San Miguel Beermen season was the 9th season of the franchise in the Philippine Basketball Association (PBA).

Transactions

Summary
The San Miguel Beermen, two-time finalist last season, will now have former national team coach Nat Canson on the bench as he took over the coaching chores from Tommy Manotoc, who moved over to Crispa Redmanizers. The Beermen missed out a berth in the semifinal round in the first two conferences. 

In the Open Conference, their import Donnie Ray Koonce teamed up with another returnee Rich Adams, formerly of N-Rich last season. The Beermen had seven wins and seven losses after the double round eliminations and they made it this time as the last team to complete the semifinal cast following a 108–104 victory over Tanduay Rhum Makers in a knockout game on November 10. San Miguel were tied with three other teams; Crispa, Great Taste and Gilbey's, after the double round semifinals with three wins and three losses each. The Beermen lost to Grandslam-seeking Crispa Redmanizers, 120–130, in a playoff for a finals berth on November 26. They placed third with a 2–1 series win against Gilbey's Gin.

Notable dates
June 23: San Miguel defeated Crispa Redmanizers, 110-99, to finally ended Crispa's amazing 21-game winning streak that dates back to the previous conference and handed the Redmanizers' first loss in the conference after nine straight wins. 

July 21: Donnie Ray Koonce scored 57 points to lead San Miguel to a come-from-behind 135–132 win over his former team Toyota, thereby eliminating the Silver Coronas.

Won-loss records vs Opponents

Roster

 Team Manager: Jose Ibazeta, Jr.

References

San Miguel Beermen seasons
San